National Geographic (formerly National Geographic Channel; abbreviated and trademarked as Nat Geo or Nat Geo TV) is an American pay television network and flagship channel owned by the National Geographic Global Networks unit of Disney Entertainment and National Geographic Partners, a joint venture between The Walt Disney Company (73%) and the National Geographic Society (27%), with the operational management handled by Walt Disney Television.

The flagship channel airs non-fiction television programs produced by National Geographic and other production companies. Like History (which was 50% owned by Disney through A&E Networks) and Discovery Channel, the channel features documentaries with factual content involving nature, science, culture, and history, plus some reality and pseudo-scientific entertainment programming. Its primary sister network worldwide, including the United States, is Nat Geo Wild, which focuses on animal-related programming, including the popular Dog Whisperer with Cesar Millan.

As of February 2015, National Geographic is available to approximately 86,144,000 pay television households (74% of households with television) in the United States.

Overview
In the United States, the National Geographic Channel launched on January 7, 2001, as a joint venture of National Geographic Television & Film and Fox Cable Networks. National Geographic provides programming expertise and the Fox Networks Group provides its expertise on distribution, marketing, and advertising sales.

The ’90s: The Last Great Decade, a documentary series narrated by Rob Lowe, pulled in 1.10 million viewers, and was the second highest-rated July telecast in the National Geographic Channel rating history. The 2000s: A New Reality, also narrated by Lowe, premiered on July 12, 2015.

On November 14, 2016, National Geographic Channel was rebranded as simply National Geographic, dropping the "Channel" from its name.

On December 14, 2017, in a deal, The Walt Disney Company announced it would buy the majority of 21st Century Fox. Disney would assume control of Fox's controlling stake in the National Geographic partnership thereafter. Following the acquisition, National Geographic and its sister channels were folded into Walt Disney Television, with the president of the National Geographic Partners reporting directly to the Walt Disney Television chairman. Disney officially closed the deal on March 20, 2019, having then added Nat Geo into its portfolio of networks.

TV shows

National Geographic Channel's TV shows, in alphabetical order:

Abandoned
Access 360° World Heritage
Air Crash Investigation
Alaska State Troopers
American Chainsaw
American Colony: Meet the Hutterites
American Genius
American Gypsies
American Weed
America's Lost Treasures
Amish: Out of Order
Ancient Secrets
Apocalypse 101
Are You Tougher Than a Boy Scout?
Banged Up Abroad
Battleground Afghanistan
Beast Hunter
Bid & Destroy
Big, Bigger, Biggest
Big Picture with Kal Penn
Bizarre Dinosaurs
Borderforce USA: The Bridges
The Boonies
Border Wars
Brain Games
Breakout
Building Wild
Cesar 911
Chasing UFOs
Construction Zone
Cosmos: A Spacetime Odyssey
Crowd Control
Diggers
Dino Autopsy
Dino Death Match
Dino Death Trap
Dinosaurs Decoded
Dogs with Jobs
Doomsday Castle
Doomsday Preppers
Drugged
Drugs, Inc.
Drain the Oceans
Duck Quacks Don't Echo
Eat: The Story of Food
Europe From Above
Expedition Wild Week 
Explorer
Eyewitness War
Family Beef
Family Guns
Forecast: Disaster
Genius
Going Ape
Hacking The System
Hard Time
Hell on the Highway
Highway Thru Hell
The Hot Zone
Inside the American Mob
Inside Combat Rescue
Inside: Secret America
Inside: Thirumala Tirupathi
Kentucky Justice
Lawless Oceans
The Legend of Mick Dodge
Let it Ride
Life After Dinosaurs
Life Below Zero
Life Hacker
The Link
Live Free or Die
Locked Up Abroad
Lords of War
Mars
Megastructures
Meltdown
Mountain Movers
Mudcats
The Numbers Game
Origins: The Journey of Humankind
One World: Together at Home
One Strange Rock
Polygamy, USA
Port Protection
Race to the Center of the Earth
Remote Survival
Richard Hammond's Engineering Connections
Rocket City Rednecks
Scam City
Science of Stupid
Seconds From Disaster
Sky Monsters
Snake Salvation
Southern Justice
StarTalk
Street Genius
The Story of God with Morgan Freeman
The Story of Us with Morgan Freeman
Supercars
SharkFest
SuperCroc
Taboo
To Catch a Smuggler
The '80s: The Decade that Made Us
The '90s: The Last Great Decade?(also entitled The '90s: The Decade that Connected Us)
The 2000s: The Decade We Saw It All
The Truth Behind
T-Rex Autopsy
T-Rex Walks
Ultimate Airport Dubai
Ultimate Dino Survivor
Ultimate Factories
Ultimate Survival Alaska
When Crocs Ate Dinosaurs
Wicked Tuna
Wicked Tuna: Outer Banks
Wild Amazon
Wild Justice
 Wild Russia
Witness: Disaster
WW2 Hell Under the sea
You Can't Lick Your Elbow
Yukon Gold
Yukon River Run

Theme fanfare music
The National Geographic Channel's signature theme fanfare music, which is played at the beginning of many of the channel's television programs, was composed by Elmer Bernstein. It was originally written in 1964 for the Society's television specials, which were broadcast on CBS, ABC, PBS and NBC from 1964 until the early 2000s.

Other National Geographic US channels

National Geographic HD
The United States 720p high definition simulcast of the National Geographic Channel launched in January 2006. It is available on all major cable and satellite providers.

Nat Geo Wild

Nat Geo Wild (stylized as Nat Geo WILD or abbreviated as NGW) is a cable/satellite TV channel focused on animal-related programs. It is a sister network to National Geographic Channel and it is the latest channel to be jointly launched by the National Geographic Society and Fox Cable Networks. It was launched in United States on March 29, 2010, focusing primarily on wildlife and natural history programming.

Nat Geo Mundo

Nat Geo Mundo is broadcast in American Spanish, and was launched in 2011. It shares programming with the Nat Geo Channel available in Hispanic American countries. The channel is fully-owned by the National Geographic Society with no involvement from Disney General Entertainment Content.

Nat Geo TV
Nat Geo TV is an application for smartphones and tablet computers, along with Windows 10. It allows subscribers of participating pay television providers (such as Time Warner Cable and Comcast Xfinity) numerous viewing options:
individual episodes of National Geographic and Nat Geo Wild's original series and documentaries (which are made available live)

Controversy and criticism
In 2013, the network began airing the reality show Are You Tougher Than a Boy Scout?. National Geographic Channel was criticized for their association with the Boy Scouts of America, an organization which, until a vote in May of that year that overturned its ban, had forbidden openly gay members.

Archaeologists have protested that National Geographic shows such as Diggers and Nazi War Diggers promote the looting and destruction of archaeological sites by promoting the work of metal detecting souvenir hunters and collectable dealers.  In 2013 the National Geographic Channel set off a firestorm of controversy with its reality show Diggers. Professional archaeologists from the Society for Historical Archaeology, the largest scholarly group concerned with the archaeology of the modern world (A.D. 1400–present), roundly criticized the network for promoting the theft of cultural materials on public and private land. The show Nazi War Diggers was accused of showing unscientific and disrespectful handling of human remains.  A promotional quote from a military relic dealer, "I feel that by selling things that are Nazi-related and for lots of money, I am preserving things that museums don't want to deal with," was removed from the channel's website in March 2014. National Geographic expressed regret for how the series was presented by its own website but maintained that many of the accusations against the series were based on misinformation. The show was repackaged, amid controversy, as Battlefield Recovery for air during 2016 on Channel 5 in the UK.

See also
 List of documentary television channels
 List of National Geographic documentary films
 List of programs broadcast by National Geographic Channel
 National Geographic Abu Dhabi
 National Geographic Channel (Asia)
 National Geographic (Australia and New Zealand)
 National Geographic (Canadian TV channel)
 National Geographic Channel (France)
 National Geographic Channel (Germany)
 National Geographic Channel (Greece)
 National Geographic Channel (India)
 National Geographic Channel (Netherlands)
 National Geographic Channel (South Korea)
 National Geographic Channel (UK and Ireland)
 National Geographic Farsi
 Nat Geo People

References

External links
 National Geographic U.S.A.
 National Geographic Latin America
 National Geographic UK
 National Geographic Russia
 National Geographic India
 National Geographic Australia
 National Geographic Netherlands
 National Geographic Iran 

Channel
Entertainment companies of the United States
Mass media companies based in Washington, D.C.
Television channels and stations established in 2001
English-language television stations in the United States
 
National Geographic Partners
Disney television networks
Peabody Award winners
Television networks in the United States
Shorty Award winners